WQRI (88.3 FM)  is the official radio station for Roger Williams University in Bristol, Rhode Island, United States. WQRI's D.J.s are students and staff at the university. They provide numerous live events, radio shows, and listening opportunities to the University and surrounding community. The station is currently owned by Roger Williams University and plays a variety of music genres which include alternative, metal, country, disco, classic rock, and many more. WQRI updated its systems in 2005 to include an internet stream.

References

External links

QRI
QRI
Radio stations established in 1989
Bristol, Rhode Island
1989 establishments in Rhode Island
Roger Williams University